Natasha Tameika Cobbs Leonard (born July 7, 1981) is an American gospel musician and songwriter. She released the extended play Grace in 2013 with the hit lead single "Break Every Chain". The EP reached No. 61 on the Billboard charts. 

At the 56th Annual Grammy Awards, Cobbs won the Grammy for Best Gospel/Contemporary Christian Music Performance. She has also won 15 Stellar Awards, 3 Billboard Music Awards, and 9 Dove Awards.

Her biggest hit song was Break Every Chain.

Early life
Natasha Tameika Cobbs was born on July 7, 1981, in Jesup, Georgia, to Bishop Fritz Cobbs (1954–2014) and Pastor Bertha Cobbs. She started leading worship at Jesup New Life Ministries, founded by her father.

Personal life 
In 2016, Cobbs Leonard revealed that she had been diagnosed with depression in 2007.

On March 3, 2017, in a private ceremony attended by family and friends, she married Kenneth Leonard, a music producer and her longtime love.  In July 2021 she adopted a son, Asher.

Ministry
Starting in 2006, Cobbs Leonard toured America with Pastor William H. Murphy III (of the dReam Center Church in Atlanta, Georgia) for three years. Since then, she has been leading worship at the dReam Center and managing the Worship and Arts department. In 2018, she appeared as herself in the film Sinners Wanted.

In 2019, Cobbs and her husband, Kenneth, founded The Purpose Place Church in Spartanburg, South Carolina, where they serve as pastors.

Music career
She started her solo music career in 2010, with the independently self-released album Smile. The album got the attention of EMI Gospel (now Motown Gospel), and they released her EP, Grace, on February 5, 2013. This was listed on two Billboard charts: the Billboard 200 at No. 61, and at No. 2 on the Top Gospel Albums chart.  The EP later reached No. 1 on the Top Gospel Albums chart. The singles "Break Every Chain" and "For Your Glory" also reached No. 1 on the Hot Gospel Songs charts. At the 56th Annual Grammy Awards in 2014, Tasha Cobbs took home Best Gospel/Contemporary Christian Music Performance, winning her first Grammy. Cobbs also won Gospel Performance of the Year, Contemporary Gospel/Urban Song  (and Album) Of The Year  at the 44th GMA Dove Awards.   In 2015, Cobbs was awarded the Gospel Artist of the Year, at the 46th GMA Dove Awards.

Discography

Albums

Guest appearances

Singles

Awards and nominations

American Music Awards

|-
| 2021
| Tasha Cobbs Leonard
| Favorite Artist – Gospel
| 
|}

ASCAP Rhythm & Soul Awards

|-
| rowspan="1" |2017
| "Put a Prise on it"
| rowspan="5" |Award Winning Gospel Songs
| 
|-
| rowspan="1" |2019
| "I'm Getting Ready"
| 
|-
| rowspan="1" |2020
| "You Know My Name"
| 
|-
| rowspan="2" |2022
| "In Spite of Me"
| 
|-
| "Jehovah Jireh"
| 
|}

BET Awards

|-
| 2016
| Tasha Cobbs Leonard
| Best Gospel Artist
| 
|-
| 2017
| "My World Needs You" 
| Dr. Bobby Jones Best Gospel/Inspirational Award
| 
|-
| 2018
| "I'm Getting Ready" 
| Dr. Bobby Jones Best Gospel/Inspirational Award
| 
|}

Billboard Music Awards

|-
| rowspan="2" | 2016
| Tasha Cobbs
| Top Gospel Artist
| 
|-
| One Place Live
| Top Gospel Album
| 
|-
| rowspan="2" | 2017
| "Put a Praise On It" 
| Top Gospel Song
| 
|-
| One Place Live
| Top Gospel Album
| 
|-
| rowspan="2" | 2018
| Tasha Cobbs Leonard
| Top Gospel Artist
| 
|-
| Heart. Passion. Pursuit.
| Top Gospel Album
| 
|-
| 2019
| Tasha Cobbs Leonard
| Top Gospel Artist
| 
|-
| 2020
| Tasha Cobbs Leonard
| Top Gospel Artist
| 
|-
| 2021
| Tasha Cobbs Leonard
| Top Gospel Artist
| 
|-
|}

GMA Dove Awards

|-
| rowspan="5" | 2013
| "Break Every Chain"
| Song of the Year
| 
|-
| Tasha Cobbs
| New Artist of the Year
| 
|-
| "Break Every Chain"
| Gospel Performance of the Year
| 
|-
| "Break Every Chain"
| Contemporary Gospel/Urban Recorded Song of the Year
| 
|-
| Grace
| Contemporary Gospel/Urban Album of the Year
| 
|-
| 2015
| Tasha Cobbs
| Gospel Artist of the Year
| 
|-
| rowspan="4" | 2016
| Tasha Cobbs
| Gospel Artist of the Year
| 
|-
| "Fill Me Up"
| Urban Worship Recorded Song of the Year
| 
|-
| One Place Live
| Urban Worship Album of the Year
| 
|-
| "Put a Praise On It"
| Traditional Gospel Recorded Song of the Year
| 
|-
| 2017
| Tasha Cobbs Leonard
| Gospel Artist of the Year
| 
|-
| rowspan="4" | 2018
| rowspan="2" | Tasha Cobbs Leonard
| Gospel Artist of the Year
| 
|-
| Artist of the Year
| 
|-
| "The Name Of Our God"
| Urban Worship Recorded Song of the Year
| 
|-
| Heart. Passion. Pursuit.
| Urban Worship Album of the Year
| 
|-
| rowspan="4" | 2019
| Tasha Cobbs Leonard
| Gospel Artist of the Year
| 
|-
| "This Is A Move (Live)"
| Gospel Worship Recorded Song of the Year
| 
|-
| Heart. Passion. Pursuit. (Live)
| rowspan="2" | Gospel Worship Album of the Year
| 
|-
| Settle Here
| 
|-
| rowspan="3" | 2020
| Tasha Cobbs Leonard
| Gospel Artist of the Year
| 
|-
| Tasha Cobbs Leonard
| Artist of the Year
| 
|-
| "Something Has To Break (Live)" 
| Gospel Worship Recorded Song of the Year
| 
|-
| 2021
| Tasha Cobbs Leonard
| Gospel Artist of the Year
| 
|-
|}

Grammy Awards

|-
| rowspan="2" | 2014
| "Break Every Chain (Live)"
| Best Gospel/Contemporary Christian Music Performance
| 
|-
| Grace
| Best Gospel Album
| 
|-
| 2016
| One Place Live
| Best Gospel Album
| 
|-
| 2020
| "This Is a Move (Live)"
| Best Gospel Performance/Song
| 
|-
|}

NAACP Image Awards

|-
| 2018
| Heart. Passion. Pursuit.
| Outstanding Gospel Album – Traditional or Contemporary
| 
|-
| 2019
| Heart. Passion. Pursuit. Live at Passion City Church
| Outstanding Gospel Album – Traditional or Contemporary
| 
|-
|}

Soul Train Music Awards

|-
| 2013
| "Break Every Chain"
| Best Gospel/Inspirational Song
| 
|-
| 2019
| Tasha Cobbs Leonard
| Best Gospel/Inspirational Award
| 
|-
| 2021
| Tasha Cobbs Leonard
| Best Gospel/Inspirational Award
| 
|}

References

Notes

Citations

1981 births
Living people
American gospel singers
African-American Christians
American women singer-songwriters
Musicians from Atlanta
21st-century American singers
21st-century American women singers
African-American women musicians
21st-century African-American women singers
20th-century African-American people
20th-century African-American women
Singer-songwriters from Georgia (U.S. state)